Peizhang Jackson He is a Chinese former American football running back. He played college football for the Arizona State Sun Devils. He became the first Chinese-born player to play for a Power Five conference team when he appeared in a game against the UCLA Bruins on December 5, 2020. A week later, against the Arizona Wildcats, he also became the first Chinese-born player to score a touchdown at the FBS level.

Early years
He was born in Shaoguan, China and was sent to the United States, by his parents, at age 17 for a better education.  His English name, Jackson He, takes inspiration from Michael Jackson. He attended Lutheran High School of San Diego where he learned to play football. Although he unsuccessfully tried for the basketball team at first, he was noticed by Ron Allen, Lutheran's football coach, due to his 250-pound weight. He was unfamiliar with the game at first, but he liked the physical intensity as well as the challenge of a new sport and stayed on the team for two years.

College football career
His college football career began at the University of Jamestown in Jamestown, North Dakota. He was recruited to play fullback at Jamestown and redshirted his first season. In 2017, his redshirt freshman season, He rushed for 376 yards on 80 carries with one touchdown. He also caught 8 passes for 40 yards and one touchdown.

He left Jamestown in 2018 and returned to China where he played professionally in the Chinese National Football League with the Foshan Tigers. However, he did not give up his football aspirations and decided to enroll at Arizona State University where he walked onto the football team. Arizona State's coach, Herm Edwards was impressed by his work ethic and viewed him as a valuable asset for the team in regards to depth, who could be a crucial part of the scout team.

He suited up in a 2020 game against UCLA wearing a jersey with his name in Chinese characters. On December 11, 2020, during a 70–7 rout of rival Arizona, He received four handoffs, which he ran for seven yards and a touchdown. With the score, He became the first Chinese-born player to score a touchdown in the FBS.

References

1997 births
Living people
American football running backs
American sportspeople of Chinese descent
Arizona State Sun Devils football players
Chinese sportspeople
Jamestown Jimmies football players
Players of American football from California